Struggle on the Nile is a 1959 Egyptian action and drama film directed by Atef Salem and written by Ali El Zorkani. It stars three of Egypt's most famous artists, Omar Sharif, Hend Rostom, and Rushdy Abaza.

This film was selected as one of The Top 100 films of the centenary of Egyptian cinema.

Plot
Omar Sharif plays Muhassab, headman Gad's son who goes with Mayor Migahed (Rushdy Abaza) to buy an expensive scow in Luxor, but the thieves become aware of this purchase and decide to steal the money.

Main cast
 Hend Rostom as Nargis
 Omar Sharif as Muhassab
 Rushdy Abaza as Mayor Migahed
 Hassan Elbaroudi as Rais Gad (the headman)
 Kamel Anwar as The thief
 Hassan Eldowini as Moled (the thief)

References
 معلومات عن صراع في النيل (Struggle on the Nile).

1950s action drama films
1959 films
1950s Arabic-language films
Egyptian action drama films
Films directed by Atef Salem
1959 drama films